Acleris albicomana, the red-edged acleris moth, is a species of moth of the family Tortricidae. It is found in North America, where it has been recorded from Alberta, Arizona, British Columbia, California, Colorado, Florida, Illinois, Indiana, Iowa, Kentucky, Maine, Manitoba, Maryland, Minnesota, Montana, New Mexico, New York, North Carolina, Ohio, Ontario, Oregon, Pennsylvania, Saskatchewan, Tennessee, Virginia and Utah.

The wingspan is 12–14 mm. Adults have been recorded on wing from April to September.

The larvae feed on Gaylussacia, Vaccinium and Quercus species, as well as Rosa californica and Rosa gymnocarpa.

References

Moths described in 1865
albicomana
Moths of North America